PIFA or Pifa may refer to:
 PIFA F.C., an Indian football club based in Mumbai
 Pennsylvania Intercollegiate Football Association
 Phenyliodine bis(trifluoroacetate)
 Planar inverted-F antenna
 Protecting Internet Freedom Act
 Punjabi International Film Academy Awards
 Ivaylo Petrov (footballer born 1973) (born 1973), Bulgarian footballer
 Pifa, an instrumental movement from George Frideric Handel's Messiah